Sirogojno is a village in Serbia located on Mt. Zlatibor. The village of Sirogojno was declared a Monument of Culture of Exceptional Importance in 1983, and it is protected by the Republic of Serbia.

Museums
It is known for his open-air museum, or "ethno village" known as the Old Village Museum, covering nearly 5 hectares with authentic elements of ordinary life collected from all over the Zlatibor region from the 19th century. The ethno village displays a set of traditional wooden buildings, including a bakery, a dairy, and an inn, all in authentic form.

Sirogojno is also housing a Knitting museum in honor of women knitters from the Zlatibor region, who created unique clothing items with their work.

Church of Saints Peter and Paul the Apostles
The Serbian Orthodox church in Sirogojno was built in 1764. It is dedicated to the apostles St. Peter and St. Paul, as is written on the royal doors beside the signature of icon painter Simeon Lazović. The reconstruction of the original layout of the church in Sirogojno was based on special preserved manuscripts, protocols, records, and other historical sources. The village graveyard is located next to the church and has gravestones from the 19th century with unique artistic pictures and texts.

Notable people
Milan Smiljanić (1891–1979), Minister of Agriculture in the Socialist Republic of Serbia (1944-1946).

See also

Monument of Culture of Exceptional Importance
Tourism in Serbia

References

External links
Photo Gallery of the Sirogojno Old Village Museum
The Sirogojno Old Village Open-Air Museum, Official Site
Information on the Old Village Museum
Photo Gallery of Sirogojno

Zlatibor
Spatial Cultural-Historical Units of Exceptional Importance
Architecture in Serbia
Populated places in Zlatibor District
Open-air museums in Serbia